The TRS-80 computer manufacturered by Tandy / Radio Shack contains an 8-bit character set. It is partially derived from ASCII, and shares the code points from 32 - 95 on the standard model. Code points 96 - 127 are supported on models that have been fitted with a lower-case upgrade.

The character set consists of letters, various numeric and special characters as well as 64 semigraphics called squots (square dots) from a 2×3 matrix. These were located at code points 128 to 191 with bits 5-0 following their binary representation, similar to alpha-mosaic characters in World System Teletext. These characters were used for graphics in games, such as Android Nim.

Character set 
The following table shows the TRS-80 model I character set. Each character is shown with a potential Unicode equivalent.  Space and control characters are represented by the abbreviations for their names.

References 
Citations

Sources

Further reading

Character sets
TRS-80